Fikri Mehmet Karadağ (born 3 January 1953) is a retired Turkish army colonel who was indicted for treason in the Ergenekon investigation for allegedly heading ultra-nationalist organizations called the Association for the Union of Patriotic Forces, and the Kuvayı Milliye Derneği (National Forces Society).

Posts

Ergenekon 

It has been alleged that Karadağ is connected to the assassination of businessman Üzeyir Garih on the basis that the perpetrators knew or were subordinate to Karadağ. Garih was assassinated on 25 August 2001 by Yener Yermez, of the Hasdal barracks' café.
Also working in the café was lieutenant Murat Oğuz, who got caught in 2001 for petty fraud with the Ergenekon investigation's key figure, Tuncay Güney.
It is alleged that both Oğuz and Yermez were subordinate to Karadağ, in the capacity of Commander of the Mechanized Regiment.

Ergenekon suspect Oktay Yıldırım (whose grenades in Ümraniye launched the investigation) was also stationed in the Hasdal barracks. Yıldırım was in the 6th Infantry Brigade from August 1999 to April 2005.

References

External links 
 Ergenekon indictment annex, folder 441. Page 150 of the PDF contains a detailed list of his posts. 

1953 births
Turkish Military Academy alumni
Turkish Army officers
Living people